Saint Wulfric may refer to:

Wulfric of Holme, 10th-century saint
Wulfric of Haselbury, 12th-century saint